Playa Forti is a beach on the Caribbean island of Curaçao, located near the village of Westpunt in the north-west of the Island. It is a sandy beach with small pebbles. There are a snack bar and a restaurant. Close to the restaurant, there is a spot where one can make a 10-metre jump from a cliff into the sea. The lyrics "We're going to jump at Playa Forti" (Dutch: Bij Playa Forti gaan we springen) figure in a song of the Curaçao group: "Diverse Sauzen".

References
Curaçao Beaches, Tourism Curaçao
 Playa Forti, Curaçao duik magazine

Beaches of Curaçao